Fist of God is the second album by Mstrkrft, released on 17 March 2009 by Last Gang Records and Dim Mak Records/Downtown Records.

Reception

Initial critical response to Fist of God was average. At Metacritic, which assigns a normalized rating out of 100 to reviews from mainstream critics, the album has received an average score of 58, based on 122 reviews. Jesse F. Keeler told Clash that he expected the mixed reception:

Track listing

Charts

References

2009 albums
MSTRKRFT albums